, better known by his ring name , is a Japanese professional wrestler. Takagi's gimmick is that he is Stone Cold Steve Austin.

He is known in Dramatic Dream Team (DDT) and around the micro-indy scene for his hilarious promos and natural charisma as well as his extensive use of comedy in his matches. He is the president of DDT and has also worked as the chief executive officer of Wrestle-1. He became the new president of Pro Wrestling Noah when CyberAgent purchased the company.

Career
Takagi was trained by Goro Tsurumi and started at his International Pro Wrestling revival promotion, IWA Kakuto Shijuku. Soon, however, Takagi broke off, seeing that IWAKS's limited exposure would only limit him to be an independent wrestler, in 1997 he formed DDT (Dramatic Dream Team), which not only would promote in Tokyo (as opposed to Tsurumi's Chigasaki, Kanagawa base), but also be based on the entertainment wrestling kingpin of the day, World Wrestling Entertainment. Since then Takagi's show has acquired a cult following as a good version of American-style entertainment wrestling. Takagi has also made appearances in All Japan Pro Wrestling, but prefers to remain his own man and his own promoter.

On May 5, 2015, Takagi was announced as the new chief executive officer (CEO) of Wrestle-1. He also continued serving as the president of DDT, while being involved with Wrestle-1's management. Starting on April 1, 2017, Takagi served in the role of an advisor to new president Kaz Hayashi. In March 2017, Wrestle-1 underwent a change in management, which led to Takagi assuming the new role of an advisor, from which he resigned the following September.

On September 1, 2017, DDT was sold to the CyberAgent company. Takagi retained his position as the company's president.

On July 15, 2019, at Wrestle Peter Pan 2019, Takagi won the inaugural O-40 Championship by defeating Super Sasadango Machine. On September 29, at Who's Gonna TOP? 2019, he lost the title to Gorgeous Matsuno.

On January 30, 2020 Takagi became new president of Pro Wrestling Noah and commented that Mitsuharu Misawa once saved DDT when he gave chances to DDT wrestlers to perform at Noah events and he wanted to rise both DDT and Noah as world class promotions.

Personal life
His wife is Kayako Takagi, who actually helped him out backstage and on-screen in DDT storylines in 2004.

Championships and accomplishments

Dramatic Dream Team
DDT Extreme Championship (2 times)
Greater China Unified Zhongyuan Tag Team Championship (2 times) – with Munenori Sawa
Ironman Heavymetalweight Championship (10 times)
Jiyūgaoka 6-Person Tag Team Championship (2 times) – with Etsuko Mita and Hero! (1) and Jun Inomata and Poison Sawada (1)
King of Dark Championship (1 time)
KO-D 6-Man Tag Team Championship (4 times) – with Akebono and Toru Owashi (1), and Kazuki Hirata and Toru Owashi (3)
KO-D 8-Man Tag Team Championship (1 time) – with Yukio Naya, Chikara and Yakan Nabe
KO-D Openweight Championship (6 times)
KO-D Tag Team Championship (4 times) – with Tomohiko Hashimoto (1), Ryuji Ito (1), Munenori Sawa (1), and Soma Takao (1)
O-40 Championship (1 time)
Sea Of Japan 6-Person Tag Team Championship (1 time) – with Yoshihiro Sakai and O.K. Revolution
Right to Challenge Anytime, Anywhere Contract (2013, 2019)
Best Unit Award (2012) New World Japan
Tokyo Gurentai
Tokyo World Heavyweight Championship (1 time)

References

External links
Sanshiro Takagi at the DDT fan site
Official Dramatic Dream Team site in Japanese

1975 births
Japanese male professional wrestlers
Living people
Sportspeople from Nagoya
Komazawa University alumni
Professional wrestling executives
20th-century professional wrestlers
21st-century professional wrestlers
DDT Extreme Champions
Ironman Heavymetalweight Champions
Jiyūgaoka 6-Person Tag Team Champions
King of Dark Champions
KO-D 6-Man Tag Team Champions
KO-D 8-Man/10-Man Tag Team Champions
KO-D Tag Team Champions
Sea of Japan 6-Person Tag Team Champions
KO-D Openweight Champions